= Khaira Majha =

Khaira Majja
- Village
- Location in Punjab, India Khaira Majja (India)
- Coordinates: 31.3641544°N 75.4637575°E
- Country: India
- State: Punjab
- District: Jalandhar

Population
  - Total: 1,200

Languages
- Time zone: UTC+5:30 (IST)
- PIN: 144001
- Telephone code: 181
- Literacy: 90%

Khaira Majha is a village in Punjab, India. It is situated midway between the two cities of Kapurthala and Jalandhar. It has a population of approximately 3,000 residents and was founded in the 18th century. There is a school in the village.

“Khaira” refers to the surname of most of the residents, and the word “Majha” (also spelled Majja) is derived from the fact that the four brothers who set up the village came from that part of the Punjab (Punjab is divided into three areas: Majha, Doaba and Malwa). A significant number of residents from this village have migrated to the Middle East (mainly Dubai), Europe (mainly the U.K.), North America and Australia. A lot of people live in the pind (the village) and they all take the surname of "Khaira." Many people either live in the village or visit the village regularly. Every Punjabi Sikh has their own village where family and friends with the same surname all live. One can own bits of the pind as your land. Within each village are houses, schools and other general infrastructure.

The village also has a Brahmin family who have been there since it was founded, parts of that family settled in the nearby village of Rasulpur Brahmana. Before partition there were Muslim families amongst whom was a teacher and there is a Muslim pir a.k.a. shrine on the outskirts. There are 3 schools in the village, one is primary and other 2 are secondary schools. The present sarpanch of village is s. kulwinder singh.
